Karl von Groddeck can refer to:
Karl-Albrecht von Groddeck  (1896–1944), decorated German soldier in the Wehrmacht
Karl-Heinrich von Groddeck (1936–2011), German rower